Suleyman-Stalsky District is an administrative and municipal district (raion), one of the forty-one in the Republic of Dagestan, Russia. It is located in the southeast of the republic. Its administrative center is the rural locality (a selo) of Kasumkent. As of the 2010 Census, the total population of the district was 58,835, with the population of Kasumkent accounting for 22.5% of that number.

Administrative and municipal status
Within the framework of administrative divisions, Suleyman-Stalsky District is one of the forty-one in the Republic of Dagestan. The district is divided into ten selsoviets which comprise thirty-eight rural localities. As a municipal division, the district is incorporated as Suleyman-Stalsky Municipal District. Its ten selsoviets are incorporated as sixteen rural settlements within the municipal district. The selo of Kasumkent serves as the administrative center of both the administrative and municipal district.

Settlements
There are 39 rural settlements in the district.

Abandoned settlements
, Biger, Darkush, Kean, Kele, Makar, Khpit, Chilik, Upper Arag, .

References

Notes

Sources

Districts of Dagestan
